The Seaboard Air Line Dining Car-#6113 is a historic Seaboard Air Line Railroad dining car in Boca Raton, Florida. It has been restored, and is located at 747 South Dixie Highway, off U.S. 1, part of the Boca Express Train Museum. On April 5, 2001, it was added to the U.S. National Register of Historic Places. It was originally built by the Budd Company in 1947 and could seat 48.

References

External links
 
 All aboard for South Florida's best train adventures at SouthFlorida.com

National Register of Historic Places in Palm Beach County, Florida
Seaboard Air Line Railroad
Boca Raton, Florida
Budd Company
Rail passenger cars of the United States